Geoff Driver (31 December 1920 – 25 April 2013) was an  Australian rules footballer who played with St Kilda and South Melbourne in the Victorian Football League (VFL).  Won club best first year player in 1945 for St Kilda.

Notes

External links 

1920 births
2013 deaths
Australian rules footballers from Victoria (Australia)
St Kilda Football Club players
Sydney Swans players